Suzy Hansen (born 1978) is an American writer. Her book Notes on a Foreign Country: An American Abroad in a Post-America World was a finalist for the 2018 Pulitzer Prize for General Nonfiction.

Early life and education
Hansen was born in Wall Township, New Jersey to parents of Danish, Italian and Irish descent. She attended Wall High School and the University of Pennsylvania for her undergraduate degree.

Career
After earning her degree, she worked as an editor at The New York Observer until 2007, when she received a fellowship from the Institute of Current World Affairs to conduct research in Turkey. While in Istanbul, she realized many misconceptions of how Americans view themselves versus how outsiders view them. This was the basis for her 2017 book, Notes on a Foreign Country: An American Abroad in a Post-America World. Her debut book about American misconceptions post 9/11 was a finalist for the 2018 Pulitzer Prize for General Nonfiction. She also visited Greece, Egypt, Iraq, and Afghanistan to investigate how American influence caused trouble and misfortune for civilians in these countries.

In 2020, she accepted a visiting professorship position at Princeton University as their Ferris Professor of Journalism. She is also a contributing writer for The New York Times Magazine and Practitioner-in-Residence at New York University’s Kevorkian Center for Near Eastern Studies.

Notes

References

1978 births
Living people
People from Wall Township, New Jersey
American women novelists
21st-century American novelists
21st-century American women writers
University of Pennsylvania alumni
Writers from New Jersey
Wall High School (New Jersey) alumni